My Name Is Albert Ayler  is a 2005 Swedish-American documentary film about the American Jazz musician Albert Ayler, written and directed by Kasper Collin.

It was produced and edited over a period of seven years (1998 to 2005) and among its participants are Donald Ayler, Edward Ayler, Carrie Roundtree, Ann Westerman, Sune Spångberg, Lionel Marshall, Bengt Frippe Nordström, Sunny Murray, Bernard Stollman, Gary Peacock, Michel Sampson, George Wein, Bill Folwell, Val Wilmer, Mutawef Shaheed, Mary Parks, Elliott Landy and Ed Michel.

It has been dubbed by JazzTimes as "one of the most starkly beautiful and moving documentaries ever made about a jazz musician" and is building on Albert Ayer's music and his voice from recorded interviews between 1963 and 1970.

The film met with mixed reviews when released in Sweden in 2005, but was praised by UK and US critics when theatrically released in those countries in 2007. Metacritic gives the film 83/100 based on reviews from 7 critics, and has awarded it the 19th best film from 2007. On Rotten Tomatoes the film has an approval rating of 94% based on reviews from 17 critics.

My Name Is Albert Ayler was director Kasper Collin's first feature documentary. The second was I Called Him Morgan.

References

External links 
 

2005 films
Documentary films about jazz music and musicians
Swedish documentary films
2005 documentary films
American documentary films
2000s English-language films
2000s American films
2000s Swedish films